Long Lake is a lake formed by the widening of the Englehart River in Timiskaming District of northeastern Ontario, Canada. 

The lake is a long, narrow lake that runs generally in a straight line from the northwest to the southeast. The lake spans five geographic townships, beginning in the southeast corner of Gross Township, then cutting the southwest corner of Blain Township before diagonally bifurcating Sharpe Township into two nearly equal parts. It then cuts through the northeast corner of Truax Township before entering Robillard Township where it narrows.

The small community of Zeta can be found on the northeast bank of the lake in Robillard Township. Mount MacDonald and Glenvale are also nearby communities. The closest town is Charlton which is located further down the Englehart River.

The lake is about 24 km in length.  

The Englehart River Fine Sand Plain and Waterway Provincial Park borders the northwestern third of the lake.

External links
Natural Resources Canada

Lakes of Timiskaming District